Parliamentary elections were held in Hungary between 31 March and 7 April 1935. The result was a victory for the Party of National Unity, which won 164 of the 245 seats in Parliament. Gyula Gömbös remained Prime Minister.

Electoral system
The electoral system remained the same as in 1931. There were 199 openly elected single-member constituencies and 11 secretly elected multi-member constituencies electing a total of 46 seats.

Results

The total number of registered voters was 3,005,742, but only 2,475,214 were in contested constituencies.

By constituency type

Notes

References

Hungary
Elections in Hungary
Parliamentary
Hungary
Hungary

hu:Magyarországi országgyűlési választások a Horthy-rendszerben#Az 1935-ös választások